This is a list of South Carolina Confederate Civil War Units. The list of South Carolina Union Civil War units is shown separately.

Infantry

 1st Infantry, 6 months, 1861
 1st (Butler's) South Carolina Regulars
 1st (Hagood's) South Carolina Volunteers
 1st (McCreary's) Infantry (1st Provisional Army)
 1st (Orr's) Rifles
 2nd Infantry (2nd Palmetto Regiment)
 3rd South Carolina Infantry
 4th South Carolina Infantry
 5th South Carolina Infantry
 6th South Carolina Infantry
 7th South Carolina Infantry
 8th South Carolina Infantry
 9th South Carolina Infantry
 10th South Carolina Infantry
 11th South Carolina Infantry (9th Volunteers)
 12th South Carolina Infantry
 13th South Carolina Infantry
 14th South Carolina Infantry
 15th South Carolina Infantry
 16th Infantry (16th-24th Consolidated Infantry)
 16th Infantry (Greenville Regiment)
 17th Infantry
 18th Infantry
 19th Infantry
 20th Infantry
 21st Infantry
 22nd Infantry
 23rd Infantry (Hatch's Regiment, Coast Rangers)
 24th Infantry (Gist's Brigade, Colleton Guard)
 25th Infantry (Eutaw Regiment)
 26th Infantry
 27th Infantry (Gaillard's Regiment)
 1st (Charleston) Battalion, Infantry (Gaillard's Battalion)
 3rd (Lawren's and James') Battalion, Infantry
 6th (Byrd's) Battalion, Infantry
 7th (Nelson's) Battalion, Infantry (Enfield Rifles)
 9th Battalion, Infantry (Pee Dee Legion)
 13th Battalion, Infantry (4th and Mattison's)
 15th Battalion, Infantry
 South Carolina (Walker's) Battalion, Infantry

Sharpshooters
 1st Battalion, Sharpshooters
 2nd Battalion, Sharpshooters
 Palmetto (1st Palmetto) Sharp Shooters (Jenkins Regiment)

Cavalry

 1st Regiment, South Carolina Cavalry
 2nd Regiment South Carolina Cavalry
 3rd Regiment, South Carolina Cavalry
 4th Regiment South Carolina Cavalry
 5th Regiment South Carolina Cavalry
 6th Regiment South Carolina Cavalry (Dixie Rangers, 1st Partisan Rangers, Aiken's Partisan Rangers)
 7th Regiment, South Carolina Cavalry
 4th Battalion, Cavalry
 10th Battalion, Cavalry
 12th Battalion, Cavalry (4th Squadron Cavalry)
 14th Battalion, Cavalry
 17th (6th) Battalion, Cavalry
 19th Battalion, Cavalry
 Tucker's Company, Cavalry
 Walpole's Company, Cavalry (Stono Scouts)
 Percival's Company (Aiken) Mounted Infantry

Artillery

Light Artillery
 1st Artillery
 Brooks Light Artillery (Company B)
 Pee Dee Artillery (Company D)
 2nd Artillery
 Inglis Light Artillery (Company D)
 3rd (Palmetto) Battalion, Light Artillery
 German Light Artillery Battalion
 Wagener's Company, Light Artillery (Company A)
 Melchers' Company, Artillery (Company B)
 Beaufort Volunteer Artillery
 Chesterfield Artillery
 Child's Company, Artillery
 Ferguson's (Beauregard's) Light Artillery Company
 Garden's Company, Light Artillery (Palmetto Light Artillery)
 Lafayette Artillery
 Lee's Company, Artillery
 Macbeth Light Artillery (Jeter's, Boyd's)
 Manigault's Battalion, Artillery
 McQueen Light Artillery (Gregg's)
 Marion Artillery
 Santee Light Artillery (Gaillard's)
 Palmetto Light Battery
 Waccamaw Light Artillery (Ward's)
 Washington Artillery

Heavy Artillery
 15th (Lucas') Battalion, Heavy Artillery
 Gilchrist's Company, Heavy Artillery (Gist Guard)
 Mathewes' Company, Heavy Artillery

Legions
 Hampton's Legion 

 Infantry Battalion
 Cavalry Battalion (2nd Cavalry Regiment)
 Edgefield Hussars (Company A)
 Hart's (Halsey's) Company, Horse Artillery (Washington Artillery)
 Holcombe Legion
 Infantry Battalion
 Cavalry Battalion

Others
 1st Regiment Charleston Guard
 Battalion State Cadets, Local Defense Troops Charleston
 Charleston Arsenal Battalion
 Conscripts, South Carolina
 2nd Rifles
 Cordes' Company, Cavalry (North Santee Mounted Rifles)
 De Saussure's Squadron of Cavalry
 Earle's Cavalry
 Estill's Company, Infantry, Local Defense (Arsenal Guard, Charleston)
 Hamilton's Company, Provost Guard
 Kirk's Company, Partisan Rangers
 Miscellaneous, South Carolina
 Ordnance Guards (Dotterer)
 Rhett's Company (Brooks Home Guards)
 Senn's Company, Post Guard
 Shiver's Company
 Simon's Company
 Simon's Company, Volunteers (Etiwan Rangers)
 Manigault's Battalion, Volunteers
 Symons' Company, Sea Fencibles
 Trenholm's Company, Rutledge Mounted Riflemen and Horse Artillery
 South Carolina College Cadets
 Palmetto Battalion
 Charleston Battalion
 Washington Light Infantry

Militia
 1st Regiment Rifles, Militia (Branch's Rifle Regiment)
 1st Regiment, Militia (Charleston Reserves)
 5th Militia
 16th Regiment, Militia
 17th Regiment, Militia
 18th Regiment, Militia
 24th Militia
 25th Militia
 Charbonnier's Company, Militia (Pickens Rifles)
 Trenholm's Company, Militia (Rutledge Mounted Riflemen)
 1st (Martin's) Mounted Militia
 4th Regiment, Cavalry Militia
 Cordes' Company, Cavalry Militia (German Hussars)
 Rutledge's Company, Cavalry Militia (Charleston Light Dragoons)
 1st Regiment Artillery, Militia

State Troops
 1st State Troops, 6 months, 1863–64
 2nd State Troops 6 months, 1863–64
 3rd State Troops, 6 months, 1863–64
 4th State Troops, 6 months, 1863–64
 5th State Troops, 6 months, 1863–64
 Rodgers' Company, Cavalry (State Troops)

Reserves
 2nd Reserves, 90 days, 1862–63
 3rd Reserves, 90 days, 1862–63
 5th Reserves, 90 days, 1862–63
 6th Reserves, 90 days, 1862–63
 7th Reserves, 90 days, 1862–63
 8th Reserves
 9th Reserves, 90 days, 1862–63
 11th Reserves 90 days, 1862–63
 3rd Battalion Reserves
 4th Battalion, Reserves
 5th (Brown's) Battalion, Reserves
 6th (Merriwether's) Battalion, Reserves
 7th (Ward's) Battalion, State Reserves
 8th (Stalling's) Battalion, Reserves
 2nd Battalion, Cavalry Reserves

See also
Lists of American Civil War Regiments by State
Confederate Units by State

References

Crute, Joseph H. Units of the Confederate States Army. Midlothian, VA.: Derwent Books, 1987. .
Estes, Claud. List of Field Officers, Regiments and Battalions in the Confederate States Army, 1861-1865. Macon, Georgia: The J. W. Burke Company, 1912. 
Jones, Jr., Charles C. General Officers, Heads Of Departments, Senators, Representatives, Military Organizations, &c,, &c., In Confederate Service During The War Between The States. Richmond, VA: Southern Historical Society, 1876. . pp. 91-95. Retrieved May 14, 2016.
Rucker, Christopher. "Ferguson's (Beauregard's) SC Artillery Company. Farm Lake Press, 2020.
United States National Park Service. Louisiana Civil War Units. Retrieved May 14, 2016.

External links 
Confederate Financier Praises Palemtto Riflemen, 1861 Shapell Manuscript Foundation

 
South Carolina
Civil War